Visa requirements for Togolese citizens are administrative entry restrictions by the authorities of other states placed on citizens of the Togo. As of 2 July 2019, Togolese citizens had visa-free or visa on arrival access to 55 countries and territories, ranking the Togolese passport 89th in terms of travel freedom (tied with passports from Gabon, Guinea, Rwanda and Senegal) according to the Henley Passport Index.

Visa requirements map

Visa requirements

Dependent, Disputed, or Restricted territories
Unrecognized or partially recognized countries

Dependent and autonomous territories

See also

Visa policy of Togo
Togolese passport

References and Notes
References

Notes

Togo
Foreign relations of Togo